Kheyrabad (also romanized as Kheyrābād) is a village in Ujan-e Gharbi Rural District, in the Central District of Bostanabad County, East Azerbaijan Province, Iran. At the 2006 census, its population was 569, in 113 families.

References 

Populated places in Bostanabad County